The Karl G. Maeser Building, also known as the MSRB, is a building that houses classrooms, administrative offices, and an assembly hall for the Brigham Young University Honors Program on the university's campus in Provo, Utah. The building is named for Karl G. Maeser.

Background

See also
List of Brigham Young University buildings

References 
Maeser Building History

University and college academic buildings in the United States
University and college administration buildings in the United States
Brigham Young University buildings
1911 establishments in Utah